Nepheroniini is a tribe of butterflies within the family Pieridae and the subfamily Pierinae. It contains two genera:
Nepheronia Butler, 1870
Pareronia Bingham, 1907

References

 
Pierinae
Butterfly tribes